HMS Undaunted was one of eight  light cruisers built for the Royal Navy in the 1910s.

Design and description
The Arethusa-class cruisers were intended to lead destroyer flotillas and defend the fleet against attacks by enemy destroyers.

The main armament of the Arethusa-class ships consisted of two BL 6-inch (152 mm) Mk XII guns that were mounted on the centreline fore and aft of the superstructure and six QF 4-inch Mk V guns in waist mountings. They were also fitted with a single QF 3-pounder  anti-aircraft gun and four  torpedo tubes in two twin mounts.

Construction and career
She was launched on 28 April 1914 at Fairfield Shipbuilding and Engineering Company's shipyard at Govan. Undaunted participated in numerous naval operations during the First World War. On commissioning she was assigned as the leader of the 3rd Destroyer Flotilla of the Harwich Force, guarding the eastern approaches to the English Channel. On 28 August 1914, Undaunted took part in the Battle of Heligoland Bight, and on 17 October 1914 she was involved in an action off the Dutch island of Texel with German torpedo boats. On 25 December 1914 she participated in the Cuxhaven Raid, and on 24 January 1915 she took part in the Battle of Dogger Bank. In April 1915 Undaunted was damaged in collision with the destroyer , and on 24 March 1916 she was again damaged in a collision, this time with the light cruiser  while covering the a raid on a Zeppelin base believed to be at Hoyer in Schleswig-Holstein. In November 1918 was reassigned to the 4th Light Cruiser Squadron of the Grand Fleet. She survived to see the end of the First World War, and was sold for scrap on 9 April 1923 to Cashmore, of Newport.

Notes

Bibliography

External links

 Ships of the Arethusa class

 

Arethusa-class cruisers (1913)
1914 ships
World War I cruisers of the United Kingdom
Ships built in Govan
Maritime incidents in 1915
Maritime incidents in 1916